Roseau Municipal Airport Rudy Billberg Field  is a public and general transportation airport  east of Roseau, Minnesota, city limits on Minnesota State Highway 61. The airport has a single paved runway 16/34 as well as a grass strip 06/24.

As of October 21, 2015, local residents were given access to the Valley Med Flight network. Residents seeking immediate emergency care within  of the airport can use the air ambulance service.

History
State records show the original Roseau Airport was graded and lighted in 1947. In 1962, the airport was relocated to its current site. According to FAA records ROX was activated in September 1962 for civil public use which corresponds to the time the runway and apron were paved.

In 1999, the airport was renamed Roseau Municipal Airport/Rudy Billberg Field. Rudy Billberg was a Roseau native and a 1998 inductee to the Minnesota Aviation Hall of Fame. Billberg, a commercial pilot and outdoorsman, was one of the state's first flight examiners. He flew commercially for 40 years in Minnesota and Alaska. He was a Northwest Airlines captain and flew B-25 air fire tankers in Alaska. Billberg died in 2007.

The airport received about $488,000 in federal funding to improve the taxiway areas in 2011.

References

Airports in Minnesota
Roseau County, Minnesota
1947 establishments in Minnesota